In naval terminology, a plot is a graphic display that shows all collated data from a ship's on-board sensors, i.e. radar, sonar and EW systems. They also displayed information from external sources - for example, other vessel or aircraft reports. There are four different types of plot, each with varying capabilities, i.e. range, depending on their role;

 Air plot: Used for tracking air contacts, i.e. planes and EW information.
 Surface plot: Used for tracking contacts on the surface of the water, i.e. other ships. It can also perform a variety of roles such as:
Providing a trace of a ship's own course and speed over time.
Plotting the position of a man overboard.
Can be used in naval gunfire support missions to plot unidentified contacts and keep track of friendly forces.
It also plays an important part in anti-submarine warfare operations and using torpedoes.
Sub-surface plot: Used for tracking contacts below the surface of the water, i.e. submarines.
General operations plot: Used for tracking shipping on a large-scale chart. Was also used to display exercise boundaries, airplanes and other significant features of maritime interest.

Notes

Military terminology
Military terminology of the United States